Eoophyla thermichrysia is a moth in the family Crambidae. It was described by George Hampson in 1917. It is found on the Bismarck Archipelago off the northeastern coast of New Guinea.

References

Eoophyla
Moths described in 1917